Valdomiro Duarte de Macedo (born 6 December 1979), known simply as Valdomiro, is a Brazilian retired footballer who played as a central defender.

Club career
Born in Salvador, Bahia, Valdomiro was promoted to Esporte Clube Bahia's first team in 1998, but only made his senior debuts two years later. After appearing regularly in the 2003 season, he moved to Clube de Regatas do Flamengo in the following year.

Valdomiro made his debut for Mengão on 27 October 2004, in a 1–1 home draw against Santos FC. However, he only played five matches during the campaign, and was subsequently released.

On 28 December 2005, after a year at Esporte Clube Santo André, Valdomiro signed for Sociedade Esportiva Palmeiras. On 21 July 2006, after only featuring for the latter in Campeonato Paulista, he agreed to a two-year deal with Primeira Liga club U.D. Leiria.

In the 2007 summer, Valdomiro joined fellow league team C.D. Trofense after being deemed surplus to requirements by União. Two years later, after appearing regularly, he moved to UAE Arabian Gulf League side Al-Wasl FC.

On 30 December 2009, Valdomiro returned to Portugal, signing an 18-month contract with Vitória de Guimarães. On 27 August of the following year he joined another club in the country and its top flight, Vitória de Setúbal.

In the summer of 2011, Valdomiro switched teams and countries again, signing for Turkish Süper Lig's Samsunspor. He only totalled 226 minutes of action during his spell, and was subsequently released.

In May 2012, Valdomiro joined Associação Portuguesa de Desportos. He suffered two consecutive relegations with the club, also being sidelined with a serious knee injury during the latter season.

On 1 May 2015, Valdomiro left Lusa after not having his contract renewed.

Honours
Portuguesa
Campeonato Paulista Série A2: 2013

References

External links

1979 births
Living people
Brazilian footballers
Association football defenders
Campeonato Brasileiro Série A players
Campeonato Brasileiro Série B players
Campeonato Brasileiro Série D players
Esporte Clube Bahia players
CR Flamengo footballers
Esporte Clube Santo André players
Sociedade Esportiva Palmeiras players
Associação Portuguesa de Desportos players
J. Malucelli Futebol players
Primeira Liga players
Liga Portugal 2 players
U.D. Leiria players
C.D. Trofense players
Vitória S.C. players
Vitória F.C. players
UAE Pro League players
Al-Wasl F.C. players
Süper Lig players
Samsunspor footballers
Brazilian expatriate footballers
Expatriate footballers in Portugal
Expatriate footballers in the United Arab Emirates
Expatriate footballers in Turkey
Brazilian expatriate sportspeople in Portugal
Sportspeople from Salvador, Bahia